Yelena Viktorovna Panova  also Elena Panova (born 9 June 1977) is a Russian actress. A noted stage actress at the Moscow Art Theater, she has been active in film and television since 1997. She is a recipient of the State Prize of the Russian Federation (2001).

Biography 
Panova's father was a theater director and an art director of the Arkhangelsk Regional Youth Theatre and her mother is a piano teacher at Arkhangelsk Pedagogical College. Her elder sister is also an actress. Panova graduated from the school-studio of Moscow Art Theater in 1999 and joined the same theater. At the theatre she has had some notable roles including Catherine in The Storm, Glagolev in Petticoat Government, The Governess in The Light Shines in the Darkness, Mavka in Forest Song, Kate in The Light Taste of Betrayal and Sonia in Crime and Punishment.

She debuted in 1997 in the movie Christmas Story and then played a Russian prostitute in Daniel Schmid's Swiss picture Beresina, or the Last Days of Switzerland (1999). In 2002 she starred alongside Inna Gomes and Sergey Gorobchenko Yuriy Moroz's crime film Kamenskaya: Za vse nado platit. She was acclaimed for her roles as Gavina in Aleksandr Mitta's series "Border. Taiga Romance" (2001) and Vicky (Vika) in Aleksei Sidorov's Shadowboxing (2005). In 2010, she starred in Anton Megerdichev's fantasy thriller Dark World alongside Svetlana Ivanova and Ivan Zhidkov.

Filmography 

1997 – Christmas Story
1999 – Beresina, or the Last Days of Switzerland – Irina
1999 – Mother – Pauline in her youth
2001 – Border. Taiga Romance (TV series) – Galina tow
2002 – Kamenskaya: Za vse nado platit – Olga Reshin
2002 – Red Sky. Black Snow – Lida (evacuee girl with child)
2003 – Land- Dasha Klyueva
2003 – Christ Under the Birches – Tanya
2004 – Shadowboxing - Vika
2004 – MOORE is MOORE (TV series) – Lida
2005 – Swan's Paradise – Lida, mayor
2006 – Bewitched Site – Dasha Klyueva
2006 – Hunter – Irene, journalist
2006 – The Husband Comes Back from a Business Trip - Katya Zagorskaya
2006 – Women's Work with a Hazard to Life, Investigator Nadezhda Postnikova
2006 – Secret Guardian – "Cobra", FSB
2007 – Shadowboxing 2: Revenge – Vika
2007 – Detective Putilin – Strekalova
2007 – Year of the Golden Fish – Masha
2007 – I'm Counting: One, Two, Three, Four, Five... , as Alisa
2008 – Friend or Foe – Olga
2008 – Time of Sins – Zina
2008 – Surprise (Russia, Ukraine) – Zoe, the former wife of Ivan
2009 – Prodigal Children (Russia, Ukraine)
2009 – House on the Lake District
2009 – Secret Guard. Deadly Game – "Cobra"
2009 – I Am Not Myself, as Lena Fufachyova
2009 – Dark World – Helvi
2010 – Dr. Tyrsa
2010 – Mother for Rent – Tamara
2010 – Fine Line (TV series), – Marina Sinitsyn
2011 – Shadowboxing 3: The Final Round – Vika
2012 – Time to love – Svetlana
2013 – Metro – Galya
2013 – Fierce – Barysheva
2014 – The Fool – Kristina
2014 - The Age of Pioneers

Awards 
In 2001, Panova was awarded the State Prize of the Russian Federation

References

External links 
 

1977 births
Living people
Russian actresses
State Prize of the Russian Federation laureates
People from Arkhangelsk
Russian stage actresses
Moscow Art Theatre School alumni